Gelligroes Mill is a water-powered corn mill in Pontllanfraith, Caerphilly county borough, south Wales. It features an overshot wheel with a cast iron frame and wooden buckets. It was built around 1625, and much altered in its working life eventually falling into disuse in the late 1980s. It was soon restored and 1992. The mill was designated as a Grade II* listed building in 1962. It is believed to have been the last mill operating commercially in Monmouthshire.

As mining developed and farming declined the business adapted to changing needs. In 1874 the owners became suppliers of seed and animal feed to smallholders, and in the 1900s generators were installed to charge batteries for customers.

When fully operational the mill contained 2 pairs of rotating stones to grind barley and wheat.

On April, 14, 1912, Artie Moore was a wireless operator and was hearing the word that the RMS Titanic was sinking.

The mill is occupied by royal candlemaker David Constable.

References

Grade II* listed buildings in Caerphilly County Borough